Baylon Spector (born October 20, 1998) is an American football linebacker for the Buffalo Bills in the National Football League (NFL). He played college football at Clemson.

College career
Spector was a member of the Clemson Tigers for five seasons and redshirted his true freshman season. He was named a starter at weak side linebacker going into his redshirt junior season and was named All-Atlantic Coast Conference by the Associated Press after leading the team with 72 tackles and 4.5 sacks. As a redshirt senior Spector was the Tigers' second-leading tackler with 85. Spector finished his college career with  210 tackles, 22.0 tackles for loss, 9.0 sacks, four forced fumbles, four fumble recoveries, and a one interception in 53 games played with 21 starts.

Professional career

The Buffalo Bills selected Spector in the seventh round, 231st overall, of the 2022 NFL Draft.

References

External links
 Buffalo Bills bio
Clemson Tigers bio

Living people
People from Calhoun, Georgia
Clemson Tigers football players
Buffalo Bills players
Players of American football from Georgia (U.S. state)
1998 births
American football linebackers

Calhoun High School alumni